The Trier University, in the German city of Trier, was founded in 1473. Closed in 1798 by order of the then French administration in Trier, the university was re-established in 1970 after a hiatus of some 172 years. The new university campus is located on top of the Tarforst heights, an urban district on the outskirts of the city. The university has six faculties with around 470 faculty members. In 2006 around 14,000 students were matriculated, with 43.5% of the student body male and 56.5% female; the percentage of foreign students was approximately 15.5%.

History

Historical university 
In 1455 Pope Nicholas V granted the Archbishop of Trier, the right to establish a university. The University of Trier was founded 16 March 1473. Battling financial problems for decades, the university was acquired by the Jesuits in 1560. They emphasized the philosophical and theological faculties at the expense of medicine and law. In the 1580s Peter Binsfeld was president of the university. In the 1730s Johann Nikolaus von Hontheim was also a faculty member. After the French occupation of the Rhineland, the French administration ordered the universities of Cologne, Mainz, Bonn and Trier closed, the last closing on 6 April 1798.

Modern university 
After a hiatus of some 172 years the University of Trier was re-established in 1970 by the state of Rhineland-Palatinate as a constituent member of the twin University of Trier-Kaiserslautern, with 360 students matriculating in Trier on 15 October 1970. In 1975 the twin university was split into two independent universities. In 1977 the current university campus in Tarforst was opened and during the 1990s a nearby former French military hospital complex (dating from the French military presence in Germany following the Second World War) was acquired by the university and now forms a second campus, dubbed Campus II.

University seal 
The modern university still uses the seal of the historical university in its corporate design. It contains the Latin motto "" (God completes the favors of wisdom from the city of Trier). In 2000 an alternative logo incorporating that seal was introduced, but this met with resistance.

Faculties 
The university is divided into six faculties ("Fachbereiche").

 FB I – Pedagogy, Philosophy, Psychology (c. 2300 students)
 FB II – Linguistics, Literature, Media (c. 2700 students)
 FB III – Egyptology, Papyrology, History, Archeology, Art history, Politics (c. 1700 students)
 FB IV – Economics, Business, Sociology, Mathematics, Computer Science (c. 3300 students)
 FB V – Law (c. 1800 students)
 FB VI – Geography, Geosciences (c. 1600 students)

There is also a Faculty of (Roman Catholic) Theology, affiliated to the university but administratively independent. It has about 300 students.

Student demographics 

 WS 2001/02: 11,867 students
 WS 2002/03: 12,660 students
 WS 2003/04: 13,082 students
 WS 2004/05: 13,327 students
 WS 2005/06: 13,755 students
 WS 2006/07: 13,932 students
 WS 2007/08: 13,982 students
 WS 2008/09: 14,639 students
 WS 2009/10: 14,612 students
 WS 2010/11: 14,931 students
 WS 2011/12: 15,260 students
 WS 2012/13: 15,165 students

While there is a considerable number of foreign students in Trier, a large majority of students hail from Rhineland-Palatinate and the adjacent German states of Saarland and Northrhine-Westphalia. This situation has been exacerbated by the introduction of tuition fees in all German states except Rhineland-Palatine, with the University of Trier having experienced an increase in the number of students from other German states—especially the neighbouring states—matriculating or transferring there. The SPD, the governing party in Rhineland-Palatinate, does not plan to introduce tuition fees.

Notable alumni 

 Mervat Seif el-Din – classical archaeologist and former director of the Graeco-Roman Museum.

Karl-Marx-University of Trier 
The General Students Committee (German: Allgemeiner Studierendenausschuss, or AStA for short)  put forward a proposal to change the university's official name to the Karl Marx University of Trier (German: Karl-Marx-Universität Trier), in honour of perhaps the city's most famous son. Although the proposal was rejected by university authorities, the General Students Committee still referred to the university as "Karl-Marx-Universität Trier", until a new coalition was formed in the students parliament in 2015.

See also 
 List of medieval universities

References

External links 

  
 Places of interest near University of Trier and overnight accommodation

 
Educational institutions established in the 15th century
University of Trier
Educational institutions established in 1970
1970 establishments in West Germany
Universities and colleges in Rhineland-Palatinate